The Federated States of Micronesia requires its residents to register their motor vehicles and display vehicle registration plates. Current plates are North American standard 6 × 12 inches (152 × 305 mm).

The designs of the plates vary by state, with Chuuk, Kosrae, Pohnpei, and Yap each issuing their own plates.

Although the history of the license plates of these islands is not well-documented, Chuuk, then known as Truk, had license plates as early as 1964.

References

Micronesia
Transport in the Federated States of Micronesia
Federated States of Micronesia-related lists